Chrysoteuchia dividellus is a moth in the family Crambidae. It was described by Snellen in 1890. It is found in India (Sikkim).

References

Crambini
Moths described in 1890
Moths of Asia